The Málaga Film Festival, formerly Málaga Spanish Film Festival (FMCE), is an annual film festival held in Málaga, Spain. The festival was established to promote Spanish cinema and help disseminate information about Spanish films. Since 2017, it features an additional focus on Ibero-American films.

History 
The first edition ran from 29 May to 6 June 1998. The guest of honor was Fernando Fernán Gómez, and the retrospective was dedicated to Montxo Armendariz. The festival's first 11 editions were directed by Salomón Castiel. In 2009, Castiel was replaced by Carmelo Romero, who helmed the festival until 2012.

Originally the festival was held anytime from March through June.
The festival has numerous screenings of the most important Spanish film releases for the previous year, including documentaries and short films.

In 2017, the festival developed an additional scope by opening to Ibero-American productions, resulting into an enlarged official selection. In 2018, director Juan Antonio Vigar made a statement about the challenge of setting March as the definitive date for the festival from the 2019 edition onward. The COVID-19 pandemic nonetheless came to disrupt the schedule of the 2020 and 2021 editions.

Awards 
The festival concedes competitive awards as well as honorary awards. The main prize is the 'Golden Biznaga' for best picture (awarded to the Best Spanish picture, and also, in a different category, to the Best Ibero-American picture). Other awardees, such as "Critic's Choice" and "Best Direction" receive Silver Biznagas. In addition the festival hosts panel discussions and round-tables on topics of current interest in Spanish cinema.

Golden Biznaga
The Golden Biznaga for Best Spanish Picture was awarded as follows:

See also 
 List of film festivals in Europe

Informational notes

References

External links
Festival website (Spanish)

Film festivals in Spain
Film festival of Malaga
Film festivals in Andalusia